Vilangudi is a panchayat town in Madurai district in the Indian state of Tamil Nadu.

Geography
Vilangudi has its ground water table at an average depth of 170 feet. This is one of the self-sustained areas in the outskirts of the city. The ground water table is very good compared to other areas.

Demographics
 India census, Vilangudi had a population of 30,884. Males constitute 50% of the population and females 50%. Vilangudi has an average literacy rate of 83%, higher than the national average of 59.5%: male literacy is 87%, and female literacy is 79%. In Vilangudi, 8% of the population is under 6 years of age.

Politics
It is a part of the Madurai (Lok Sabha constituency). S. Venkatesan also known as  Su. Venkatesan from CPI(M) is the Member of Parliament, after the 2019 Indian general election.

This area is in the Madurai West (state assembly constituency).

References

Cities and towns in Madurai district